is a Japanese professional wrestler. He originally started his career in Wrestling Marvelous Future in August 2003, but later left the promotion and in 2004, signed with Dark Pro-Wrestling 666 (666). Miyamoto has since appeared in Big Japan Pro Wrestling (BJW), Dramatic Dream Team (DDT) and All Japan Pro Wrestling (AJPW).

Miyamoto is a former one-time DDT Extreme Champion, two-time BJW Deathmatch Heavyweight and a two-time Dove Pro Heavyweight Champion and a one-time CZW Ultraviolent Underground Champion. He is also known as one half of the tag team  with Isami Kodaka, where they are one-time KO-D Tag Team Champions, three-time BJW Tag Team Champions, one-time Wave Tag Team Champions, two-time All Asia Tag Team Champions and have also won the Dai Nihon Saikyo Tag League three times. In 2016, Miyamto formed a tag team with Harashima, named , where they were one-time KO-D Tag Team Champions.

Early life
Yuko Miyamoto was known as a troublemaker in his youth. He was a part of a motorcycle gang in high school and ultimately dropped out. He would become a steeplejack worker and this skillset certainly became of use when he transitioned to the death match style of pro-wrestling. His athletic background is in association football and snowboarding.

Professional wrestling career

Wrestling Marvelous Future (2003–2004)
Miyamoto would find himself as a trainee in WMF (Wrestling Marvelous Future) as he would spare with Mammoth Sasaki. His debut would come on August 2, 2003 against Mineo Fujita in Tokushima, Japan. He would then become aligned with the Dark Pro-Wrestling 666 promotion, run by the Crazy SKB.

Big Japan Pro Wrestling (2004–present)
Miyamoto would go on to compete in Big Japan Pro Wrestling (BJW) in which he would begin working in the death match style in 2006, after BJW ran a recruitment for wrestlers to compete in death matches. Miyamoto would then go on to win his first ever death match in his career. In the deathmatch circles, Yuko found himself a generational rival in Isami Kodaka.

In 2007 Miyamoto would begin teaming with Takashi Sasaki as the two would remain as a team, off and on, throughout the years to come, they even got close to winning the Dai Nihon Saikyo Tag League and becoming the new BJW Tag Team Champions.

On May 4, 2008 Miyamoto defeated the veteran Shadow WX to win the BJW Deathmatch Heavyweight Championship. Miyamoto would go on to compete in the United States in 2009 and even go on to capture the CZW Ultraviolent Championship from Nick Gage. Miyamoto would go on to make five successful defenses with the belt defeating Masashi Takeda, Abdullah Kobayashi, Mad Man Pondo, Takashi Sasaki and Isami Kodaka before losing it to Ryuji Ito on May 4, 2010.

In 2010, Miyamoto formed a new tag team named "Deathmatch Nichokenju", later renamed "Yankii Nichokenju", with longtime rival Isami Kodaka.

On May 5, 2011 Yankii Nichokenju won their first title together, when they defeated Jaki Numazawa and Jun Kasai for the BJW Tag Team Championship.

On March 29, 2012, Miyamoto defeated his partner Isami Kodaka to win the DDT Extreme Championship as part of an interpromotional rivalry between Union Pro and BJW. On April 1, Kodaka and Miyamoto also lost the BJW Tag Team Championship to Shinobu and Yoshihito Sasaki. On July 18 Miyamoto lost the DDT Extreme Championship to Shuji Ishikawa in a BJW and Union Pro co-event. The two bounced back on November 22 by winning the 2012 Dai Nihon Saikyo Tag League and becoming the new BJW Tag Team Champions.

On May 5, 2014, Yankii Nichokenju faced off in a 300 fluorescent light tube TLC deathmatch for the BJW Deathmatch Heavyweight Championship. Kodaka won the match, making his fourth successful title defense. On May 31 Yankii Nichokenju lost the BJW Tag Team Championship to Twin Towers (Kohei Sato and Shuji Ishikawa), ending their eighteen-month reign at seventeen successful title defenses. On June 15 Miyamoto would recapture the BJW Deathmatch Heavyweight Championship defeating Ryuji Ito. On November 21, Yankii Nichokenju defeated Abdullah Kobayashi and Ryuji Ito in the finals to win their third Dai Nihon Saikyo Tag League in a row. On December 31, Yankii Nichokenju took part in Toshikoshi Puroresu, an annual new year's collaboration event between BJW, DDT and Kaientai Dojo, winning the Tenka Toitsu! tournament, held for the first time in a tag team format.

After five successful title defenses Miyamoto lost the BJW Deathmatch Heavyweight Championship to Abdullah Kobayashi on May 5, 2015.

DDT Pro-Wrestling (2013–present)
On August 18, 2013 at Ryōgoku Peter Pan 2013, DDT's biggest event of the year, Miyamoto and Kodaka defeated Hikaru Sato and Yukio Sakaguchi to win the KO-D Tag Team Championship for the first time and become double tag team champions. Following their win, Miyamoto and Kodaka vowed to successfully defend their double crown hundred times. Yankii Nichokenju went undefeated for most of 2013, before losing to Speed of Sounds (Hercules Senga and Tsutomu Oosugi) in a non-title match on October 18. Miyamoto dominated independent wrestling awards ceremony, winning the Best Unit Award with Isami Kodaka.

Yankii Nichokenju's reign as double tag team champions came to an end on January 26, 2014, when they lost the KO-D Tag Team Championship to the Golden☆Lovers (Kenny Omega and Kota Ibushi) in a three-way match, also involving the team of Konosuke Takeshita and Tetsuya Endo. 

On June 12, 2016, during a DDT event Miyamoto pinned Danshoku Dino, claiming Dino's right to challenge anytime, anywhere. After the match he declared that he wanted to challenge Konosuke Takeshita for the KO-D Openweight Championship. On July 3 Miyamoto unsuccessfully challenged Takeshita for the KO-D Openweight Champion. Later Miyamoto would join the stable Smile Squash in DDT and form a team with Harashima named Smile Yankiis. On August 28 at Ryōgoku Peter Pan 2016, Smile Yankiis defeated KAI and Ken Ohka to win the KO-D Tag Team Championship. On September 25, Smile Yankees defeated Daisuke Sasaki and Tetsuya Endo to make their first successful title defense of the KO-D Tag Team Championship. On October 9, Miyamoto and Harashima lost the KO-D Tag Team Championship in the second title defense to Sasaki and Endo in a rematch.

All Japan Pro Wrestling (2015–present)
In October 2015, Yankii Nichokenju took part in All Japan Pro Wrestling (AJPW)'s Jr. Tag Battle of Glory, where they finished second with a record of two wins, one draw and one loss, suffered against Atsushi Aoki and Hikaru Sato in their last round-robin match, the de facto final of the tournament. On November 15, Kodaka and Miyamoto defeated Kotaro Suzuki and Yohei Nakajima in a decision match to win the vacant All Asia Tag Team Championship. During Miyamoto and Kodaka's title defenses of the All Asia Tag Team Champions Yankii Nichokenju joined the Axe Bombers stable. After six successful title defenses, Miyamoto and Kodaka lost the All Asia Tag Team Championship to Atsushi Aoki and Hikaru Sato on July 24 at a BJW event.

Other appearances
On July 27, Yankii Nichokenju won women's wrestling promotion Pro Wrestling Wave (Wave)'s Tag Team Championship by defeating Las Aventureras (Ayako Hamada and Yuu Yamagata). On August 24, Yankii Nichokenju lost the Wave Tag Team Championship to Sakuragohan (Kyusei Sakura Hirota and Mika Iida) in a three-way match, which also included Las Aventureras. On October 2, Kodaka made an appearance for Pro Wrestling Noah, teaming with Yuko Miyamoto and Daisuke Sekimoto in a six-man tag team main event, where they defeated Atsushi Kotoge, Hitoshi Kumano and Naomichi Marufuji. 

In July, Miyamoto made it to the finals of Pro Wrestling Zero1 (Zero1)'s 2015 Tenkaichi Jr. tournament, but was defeated there by Takuya Sugawara. Also in Zero1, Yankii Nichokenju joined the stable Dangan Yankies.

Championships and accomplishments
666
666 Chaos Openweight Championship (1 time)
All Japan Pro Wrestling
All Asia Tag Team Championship (2 times) – with Isami Kodaka
Big Japan Pro Wrestling
BJW Deathmatch Heavyweight Championship (2 times)
Yokohama Shopping Street 6-Man Tag Team Championship (3 times) – with Abdullah Kobayashi and Jaki Numazawa, Jaki Numazawa and Ryuji Ito, and Ryuji Ito and Takashi Sasaki 
BJW Tag Team Championship (3 times) – with Isami Kodaka
Saikyo Tag League (2012, 2013, 2014) – with Isami Kodaka
Chō Hanabi Puroresu
Bakuha-ō Championship (1 time)
Combat Zone Wrestling
CZW Ultraviolent Underground Championship (1 time)
DDT Pro-Wrestling
DDT Extreme Championship (2 times)
Ironman Heavymetalweight Championship (215 times)
KO-D Tag Team Championship (2 times) – with Isami Kodaka (1) and Harashima (1)
Dove Pro-Wrestling
Dove World Heavyweight Championship (2 times)
IWA East Coast
Masters of Pain Tournament (2009) 
Japan Indie Awards
Best Bout Award (2007) vs. Takashi Sasaki on March 14
Best Unit Award (2013) – with Isami Kodaka
Pro Wrestling Freedoms
King Of FREEDOM World Title #1 Contendership One Day Tournament
Pro Wrestling Illustrated
Ranked No. 216 of the top 500 wrestlers in the PWI 500 in 2020
Pro Wrestling Wave
Wave Tag Team Championship (1 time) – with Isami Kodaka
Pro Wrestling Zero1
NWA Intercontinental Tag Team Championship (1 time) – with Masashi Takeda
Fire Festival (2018)
Tokyo Gurentai
Tokyo Intercontinental Tag Team Championship (1 time) – with Isami Kodaka
Toshikoshi Puroresu
Tenka Toitsu! Tag Tournament (2014) – with Isami Kodaka
Toshiwasure! Shuffle Tag Tournament (2018) – with Konosuke Takeshita

References

1982 births
Living people
People from Hiroshima Prefecture
Japanese male professional wrestlers
All Asia Tag Team Champions
DDT Extreme Champions
KO-D Tag Team Champions
21st-century professional wrestlers
BJW Deathmatch Heavyweight Champions
BJW Tag Team Champions
Yokohama Shopping Street 6-Man Tag Team Champions